The jurisprudence of concepts was the first sub-school of legal positivism, according to which, the written law must reflect concepts, when interpreted. Its main representatives were Ihering, Savigny and Puchta.

This school was, thus, the preceding trigger of the idea that law comes from a dogmatic source, imposition from man over man and not a natural consequence of other sciences or of metaphysical faith.

Among the main characters of the jurisprudence of concepts are:
 formalism, search of rights in written law
 systemisation
 search for justifying specific norm with basis from more generic ones.

So, according to this school, law should have prevailing sources based upon the legislative process, although needing to be proven by more inclusive ideas of a social sense.

See also 
 Jurisprudence of values
 Jurisprudence of interests
 Philosophy of law
 Legal positivism
 Legal naturalism
 Hermeneutics

References 

Theories of law
Formalism (philosophy)
Concepts
Legal positivism